The Seneschal of Normandy was an officer carrying out and managing the domestic affairs of the lord of the Duchy of Normandy.  During the course of the twelfth century, the seneschalship, also became an office of military command.

The seneschal managed the household, coordinating between the receivers of various landholdings and the chamber, treasury, and the chancellory or chapel.  The seneschals of Normandy, like those appointed in Gascony, Poitou, and Anjou had custody of demesne fortresses, the regional treasuries, and presidency of the highest court of regional custom.

List of Seneschals

English
Robert du Neufburg
William de Saint-Jean (1171)
William de Courcy 
Richard of Ilchester (1176-1178)
William FitzRalph (1178-1200)
Guérin de Glapion (1200-1201)
Ralph Tesson (1201-1203)
William Crassus (1203)

References
 Warren, W.L.; Henry II (English Monarchs)

12th century in France
13th century in France
Historical legal occupations
Legal history of France